Kārlis Baumanis (11 May 1835 – 10 January 1905), better known as Baumaņu Kārlis, was an ethnic Latvian composer in the Russian Empire. He is the author of the lyrics and music of  Dievs, svētī Latviju!  (“God bless Latvia!”), the national anthem of Latvia.

Kārlis Baumanis was the first composer to use the word “Latvia” in the lyrics of a song, in the 19th century, when Latvia was still a part of the Russian Empire.

Biography
Kārlis Baumanis was born on 11 May 1835, in Viļķene (Wilkenhof), in the family of peasants Jekab and Anna Baumanis.  He created the Latvian national anthem "God bless Latvia" in 1870. He lived and worked in Limbaži (Lemsal) as a teacher and a journalist. An important milestone in his life was the election of the Speaker of the Riga Latvian Society and the Member of the Singing Commission in 1870, where he participated gigantically in the preparation of the First General Latvian Singing Festival. This year he married Marija Carolini Elizabeth, the daughter of Ferdinand von Vite, tenant of Sāra manor, and was a German teacher at the prestigious Smolny Institute of Exotic Nursery.

In 1871, he completed the composition studies with the Czech musician Voiceha Hlavach. On November 14, 1872, his daughter, Lilia Elizabeth, was born. In 1873 he was rewarded for his success in pedagogical work by the Holy Spirit. Anna's Order.  Kārlis Baumanis died on 11 January 1905, in Limbaži at the age of 69.

References

Baumanis, Karlis biography - S9.com

1835 births
1905 deaths
People from Limbaži Municipality
People from Kreis Wolmar
19th-century classical composers
19th-century Latvian people
20th-century classical composers
Composers from the Russian Empire
Latvian composers
National anthem writers
Russian Romantic composers